is a Japanese comedy television show and movie series. To date, there have been two Kisarazu Cat's Eye movies: Kisarazu Cat's Eye Nihon Series (2003) and Kisarazu Cat's Eye World Series (2006).

Synopsis
The story follows a 21-year-old young man named Kohei (Okada Junichi) in Kisarazu, a city in Chiba, Japan. Diagnosed with cancer, he has 6 months to live, but instead of being depressed, he decides to make something of the time he has left.

The show focuses mainly on Kohei and his close friends: They grew up on the same high school baseball team. Kohei, known as Bussan to his close friends, forms the group "Kisarazu Cat's Eye" which also consists of Bambi (Sakurai Sho), Master (Ryuta Sato), Ani (Tsukamoto Takashi), and Ucchi (Okada Yoshinori). The theme of the group is based on a manga (Japanese comic) called Cat's Eye or キャッツ アイ. The friends, however, play baseball during the day while getting into mischief at night. Sometimes they solve life crises; mainly, however, they solve smaller, humorous problems.

Cast
 Bussan (Kohei Tabuchi) - Junichi Okada
 Bambi (Futoshi Nakagomi) - Sho Sakurai
 Ucchi (Uchiyama) - Yoshinori Okada
 Master (Shingo Okabayashi) - Ryuta Sato
 Ani (Kizashi Sasaki) - Takashi Tsukamoto
 Mouko - Wakana Sakai
 Kaoru Nekota - Sadao Abe
 Yamaguchi-senpai - Tomomitsu Yamaguchi
 Mirei Asada - Hiroko Yakushimaru
 The cafe owner - Daisuke Shima
 Sasaki Jun (Ani's brother) - Hiroki Narimiya
 Rose (The Second Generation Kisarazu Rose) - Aiko Morishita
 Ojii / Ozu Yujirou & Shintaro - Arata Furuta
 Kousuke Tabuchi (Bussan's Father) - Fumiyo Kohinata
 Setsuko (Master's wife) - Mihoko Sunouchi
 Miiko (Ucchi's girl) - Kami Hiraikawa
 Ichiko - Yumiko Nosono
 Takeda (Police Officer) - Hiroki Miyake
 Vice Principal - Yasuhito Hida
 Kishidan (氣志團) playing a fictional version of themselves in episode 7
 You (actress) - Asari Mizuki

Episodes

External links
Official website (in Japanese)

Kin'yō Dorama
2002 Japanese television series debuts
2002 Japanese television series endings
Baseball television series
Television shows written by Kankurō Kudō